Khalid bin Saleh bin Ibrahim (Arabic:خالد المنيف), a Saudi author. He has books on psychology and self-development. He was born in 1975. He writes weekly for Al-Jazeera newspaper. Also, he supervises on (Refresh your life) page, and he has many Self-improvement publications literature like (Open The Window There's A Light), and Royal Phase.

Education 

 Bachelor's Degree – Collage Of Sharia  – Major in Islamic Sharia .
 Bachelor's Degree in Administration Science – Accounting major.
 Master Of Business Administration – Human Resources Administration.

Works 

 Open the window there is a light
 Color your life
 A date with life 1& 2
 Falls with roses
 You are spring so what if something shriveled
 You are born to win
 Ideas to live by
 On the shore of joy
 Tastes
 Your morning smile
 Happiness grocery
 Royal phase
 Khaled selections
 Grow up your brain

References 

1975 births
21st-century Saudi Arabian writers
Living people